Daisy Maria Florence Senanayake (née Mendis) (19 June 1903 - 3 December 1988) was the first female Member of Parliament in Sri Lanka (formerly Ceylon).

Daisy Maria Florence Mendis was born on 19 June 1903 into a family of eight children in Rawatawatta, Moratuwa. Her father, K. E. Mendis, was a planter. She was educated at the Princess of Wales' College, Colombo.

In 1925 she married Reginald S. Vincent Senanayke (1898-1946), a planter and founding member of the Lanka Sama Samaja Party and its treasurer between 1935 and 1939.  
 
Senanayake was elected in 1947 at the 1st Ceylonese parliamentary elections, as the member for Kiriella, representing the Lanka Sama Samaja Party. She polled 5,535 votes (35.5% of the total vote) winning against a field of five other male candidates, with her nearest opponent, T. K. W. Chandrasekera, receiving 3,294 votes (21.1% of the total vote). Senanayake failed to retain the seat at the 2nd parliamentary elections in 1952, where she received 3,192 votes (15% of the total votes), with the successful candidate, A. E. B. Kiriella, polling 9,978 votes (48% of the total vote).

She and her husband had six children, including the Laki Senanayake who became an artist.

References

1903 births
Lanka Sama Samaja Party politicians
Members of the 1st Parliament of Ceylon
Women legislators in Sri Lanka
1988 deaths